In 1881, the conquest of Tunisia was initiated by the French Third Republic. The invasion began on 
28 April 1881, and lasted until 28 October 1881. Meanwhile, the Treaty of Bardo was signed on 12 May 1881. According to the treaty, the Beylik of Tunis would become a French protectorate from 1881 to 1956, when Tunisia regained its independence as the Kingdom of Tunisia.

List

(Dates in italics indicate de facto continuation of office)

See also
 Beylik of Tunis
 Kingdom of Tunisia
 French Algeria
 List of French governors of Algeria
 French protectorate in Morocco
 List of French residents-general in Morocco

Sources
 http://www.rulers.org/rult.html#tunisia
 African States and Rulers, John Stewart, McFarlan
 Heads of State and Government, 2nd Edition, John V da Graca, MacMillan Press (2000)

French residents-general
French residents-general